The Gloire-class frigate was a type of 18-pounder 40-gun frigate, designed by Pierre-Alexandre Forfait in 1802. They were built on the specifications of the  Pensée (sometimes also called Junon class).

Ships in class

Builder: Basse-Indre
Ordered: 
Launched: 20 July 1803
Completed: 
Fate: captured by the British Navy 1806, becoming HMS Gloire.

Builder: Basse-Indre
Ordered: 
Launched: 4 June 1804
Completed: 
Fate: captured by the British Navy 1806, becoming HMS President.

 
Builder: Basse-Indre
Ordered: 
Launched: 1 March 1805 
Completed: 
Fate: captured by the British Navy 1809, becoming HMS Alcmene.

Builder: Le Havre
Ordered: 
Launched: 5 April 1806 
Completed: 
Fate: captured by the British Navy 1810, becoming HMS Nereide.

 
Builder:  Le Havre
Ordered: 
Launched: 16 August 1806 
Completed: 
Fate: captured by the British Navy 1809, becoming HMS Junon.

Builder: Lorient
Ordered: 
Launched:  9 January 1807
Completed: 
Fate: severely damaged 1809, sold 1813 or 1814.

Builder: Le Havre
Ordered: 
Launched: 20 July 1807 
Completed: 
Fate: burnt by the Royal Navy 1811.

References

Notes

Bibliography 

 Rif Winfield, British Warships in the Age of Sail, 1714-1792, Seaforth Publishing, 2008, .

 
Frigate classes